Bridget Galloway (born 19 July 1999) is an English footballer player, playing as a forward for Durham in the FA Women's Championship. She has represented England at under-19 level.

Club career

Sunderland 
Galloway made her first team debut for Sunderland on 29 October 2016, replacing Beth Mead in the 80th minute of a 0–0 draw with Notts County in the WSL 1.

Galloway's first team involvement increased in 2017–18. She scored her penalty in a WSL Cup shoot-out win against Sheffield F.C. on 16 November 2018. She scored her first goal on 5 December 2017 in a 1–0 WSL Cup win against Liverpool, heading in the eventual winner. Her first league goal came five days later in a 5–1 defeat at Everton in the WSL 1. On 20 May 2018, Galloway scored Sunderland's last WSL 1 goal with a winner on the last day of the season against Yeovil Town.

Following Sunderland's demotion to the FA Women's National League, Galloway scored the team's first goal of the 2018–19 season, scoring a penalty against Bradford City on 26 August 2018. She scored her first senior hat-trick on 18 November 2018 in a 5–2 home win against Derby County.

Durham 
After two seasons in the National League with Sunderland, Galloway decided to move on and joined FA Women's Championship club Durham on 14 July 2020.

International career 
Galloway has represented England at under-19 level. She received her first call-up in January 2018 before making her debut against Ireland on 19 January 2018. She scored her first goal for England on 4 March 2018 in a 4–3 win over the Czech Republic. She got her second goal for the under-19's in the UEFA Women's Under-19 Championship qualifying round, scoring the opening goal in a 4–1 win against Israel on 3 April 2018.

Career statistics

Club 
.

References

1999 births
Living people
English women's footballers
Women's association football forwards
Sunderland A.F.C. Ladies players
Durham W.F.C. players